Shabani (adjective form of شعبان (Sha'ban), the name of the eighth month of the Islamic calendar) is a Muslim surname and may refer to:

Agim Shabani (born 1988), Norwegian footballer of Albanian descent
Bujar Shabani (born 1990), Kosovar-Albanian footballer; see 2018–19 FC Drita season
Bunjamin Shabani (born 1991), ethnic Albanian footballer from the Republic of Macedonia
Hussein Shabani (born 1990), Burundian footballer
Nasser Shabani (died 2020), Iranian general 
Razie Shabani (1925–2013), Azerbaijani politician and activist
Shabani Nonda (born 1977), retired DR Congolese footballer
Xhevdet Shabani (born 1986), Kosovar-Albanian footballer

Places
Shabani, Iran, village in Kurdistan Province, Iran
Shabani, Zimbabwe, mining town Zimbabwe

Other uses
Shabani (gorilla) (born 1996), a tightrope-walking western lowland gorilla at the Higashiyama Zoo in Nagoya, Japan

See also
Sha'ban (disambiguation)
Shaybanids, dynasty

Persian-language surnames
Albanian-language surnames
Swahili-language surnames